Owen Goodnight (August 27, 1917 – May 13, 1967) was an American football halfback. He played for the Cleveland Rams in 1941.

References

1917 births
1967 deaths
People from Bell County, Texas
Players of American football from Texas
American football halfbacks
Hardin–Simmons Cowboys football players
Cleveland Rams players